Irena is a traditionally European feminine given name.

Irena Bačiulytė (born 1939), Lithuanian rower
Irena Brynner (1917–2003), Russian-born American sculptor, jewelry designer, author
Irena Degutienė (born 1949), Lithuanian politician and twice acting Prime Minister
Irena Fleissnerová (born 1958), Czech swimmer
Irena Jarocka (1946–2012), Polish singer
Irena Karpa (born 1980), Ukrainian writer, journalist and singer
Irena Milovan (1937–2020), Yugoslav ballet dancer
Irena Olevsky (born 1974), Australian synchronized swimmer
Irena Pavelková (born 1974), Czech slalom canoer
Irena Šedivá (born 1992), Czech javelin thrower
Irena Sendler (1910–2008), Polish social worker and resistance member who saved Jewish children during the Nazi occupation
Irena Šiaulienė (born 1955), Lithuanian politician 
Irena Swanson, Yugoslav-born American mathematician
Irena Szewińska (born 1946), Polish sprinter
Irena Turkevycz-Martynec (1899–1983), Ukrainian-Canadian opera singer
Irena Veisaitė (1928–2020), Lithuanian academic and human rights activist

Lithuanian feminine given names
Polish feminine given names
Czech feminine given names